Tetragonoderus tesselatus is a species of beetle in the family Carabidae. It was described by Maximilien Chaudoir in 1876.

References

Beetles described in 1876
tesselatus